Four regiments of the British Army have been numbered the 93rd Regiment of Foot:

93rd Regiment of Foot (1760), raised in 1760
93rd Regiment of Foot (1780), raised in 1780
93rd Regiment of Foot (1793), raised in 1793
93rd (Sutherland Highlanders) Regiment of Foot, raised in 1799